Rost'om (Rostom) Omeris Abashidze (born 23 February 1935) is a retired light-heavyweight Greco-Roman wrestler from Georgia. Competing for the Soviet Union he won the world title in 1958, 1962 and 1963 and placed fifth at the 1964 Summer Olympics.

Abashidze first trained in swimming and association football before changing to wrestling. After graduating from secondary school in Batumi he moved to Tbilisi, where he studied at the Georgian Technical University and later defended a PhD in construction engineering. Shortly before the 1964 Olympics he fell ill with hepatitis A and have not fully recovered. He retired from competitions after the games to become a wrestling coach in Georgia. Later he also held executive positions in the construction industry.

References

External links
 

1935 births
Living people
Sportspeople from Batumi
Olympic wrestlers of the Soviet Union
Wrestlers at the 1964 Summer Olympics
Male sport wrestlers from Georgia (country)
Soviet male sport wrestlers
World Wrestling Championships medalists